Mowbray is a coastal locality in the Shire of Douglas, Queensland, Australia.

Geography 
Most of the terrain in Mowbray is mountainous with peaks such as Mount Garioch , Mount Charlie  and Harris Peak . Most of this mountain terrain is within a number of protected areas: Mowbray Conservation Park and Mowbray National Park to the west (covering the Great Dividing Range) and Macalister Range National Park for the hilly land in the east. Most of the unprotected land is in the north of the locality around the valleys of the Mowbray River and its tributary Spring Creek. The residential areas are in these valleys. The Captain Cook Highway passes through the locality from south to north, hugging the Coral Sea coast for much of the way. The low-lying river flats are used to grow sugarcane.

Oak Beach is a small township along the coast of Mowbray which has been excised into its own locality.

History 
The locality of Mowbray was originally known as Mowbray River (which flows through the locality).

Education
There are no schools in Mowbray, but the nearest primary school is in Port Douglas and the nearest secondary school is in Mossman.

References 

Shire of Douglas
Coastline of Queensland
Localities in Queensland